Uhle is a surname. Notable people with the surname include:

Claudia Uhle (born 1976), German singer
George Uhle (1898–1985), Baseball pitcher
Johann Paul Uhle (1827–1861), German physician and pathologist
Karl Uhle (1887–1969), German football player
Max Uhle (1856–1944), German archaeologist
Wolfgang Uhle (1512–1594), German Lutheran priest

See also:
Ule, German surname
Colegio Max Uhle, German international school in Arequipa, Peru